Thomas Miller (July 24, 1898 – February 2, 1993) was an American politician. He served as a Republican member of the Wyoming Senate.

Life and career 
Miller was born in Lusk, Wyoming. He attended Lusk High School and served with the United States Army Corps of Engineers during World War I.

In 1953, Miller was elected to the Wyoming Senate, representing Niobrara County, Wyoming, serving until 1955. In 1957, he served as Wyoming Attorney General, succeeding George F. Guy. He served until 1959, when he was succeeded by Norman B. Gray.

Miller died in February 1993 at the Boswell Memorial Hospital, at the age of 94.

References 

1898 births
1993 deaths
People from Lusk, Wyoming
Republican Party Wyoming state senators
20th-century American politicians
Wyoming Attorneys General